Jiří Veselý was the defending champion and successfully defended his title, defeating Laslo Djere in the final, 6–4, 6–2.

Seeds

Draw

Finals

Top half

Bottom half

External links
 Main Draw
 Qualifying Draw

2015 ATP Challenger Tour
2015 Singles